Palaeeudyptes gunnari is an extinct species of the extinct penguin genus Palaeeudyptes. It was a bit smaller than its congener Palaeeudyptes antarcticus of New Zealand, standing  between 110 and 125 cm high, approximately the size of the emperor penguin. It is known from dozens of fossil bones from Middle or Late Eocene strata (34-50 MYA) of the La Meseta Formation on Seymour Island, Antarctica. Initially, it was described as a separate genus, Eosphaeniscus. However, this was based on a single weathered and broken tarsometatarsus. Better material recovered later showed that the species belongs into the present genus.

Wimanornis is probably a synonym of this species (Jadwiszcak, 2006).

References

 
 Myrcha, Andrzej; Jadwiszczak, Piotr; Tambussi, Claudia P.; Noriega, Jorge I.; Gaździcki, Andrzej; Tatur, Andrzej & Del Valle, Rodolfo A. (2002): Taxonomic revision of Eocene Antarctic penguins based on tarsometatarsal morphology. Polish Polar Research 23(1): 5–46. PDf fulltext
 Simpson, George Gaylord (1946): Fossil penguins. Bull. Am. Mus. Nat. Hist. 87: 7-99. PDF fulltext
 Wiman, Carl (1905): Vorläufige Mitteilung über die alttertiären Vertebraten der Seymourinsel. Bulletin of the Geological Institute of Uppsala 6: 247–253. [Article in German]

gunnari
Eocene birds
Extinct penguins
Cenozoic Antarctica
Cenozoic animals of Oceania
Extinct animals of Antarctica
Extinct birds of New Zealand
Cenozoic animals of Antarctica
Taxa named by Carl Wiman
Fossil taxa described in 1905